Coleophora uniformis is a moth of the family Coleophoridae. It is found in Japan.

The wingspan is 9–10 mm.

References

uniformis
Moths of Japan
Moths described in 1965